Wake Up and Smell the Coffee is the fifth studio album by Irish alternative rock band The Cranberries, and their last before their six-year hiatus. Released on 22 October 2001, the album sold 170,000 copies in the US by April 2007. Worldwide, the album had sold 1,300,000 copies by 2002.

This marks the band's only album on MCA Records. They were transferred to MCA after the merger of PolyGram (which owned their previous label, Island Records) with MCA's parent Universal Music Group in 1999. 

While the album did not initially receive a vinyl release, on 16 February 2023, it was announced that the album would receive a limited vinyl issue for Record Store Day on 22 April 2023.

Artwork
Several different covers exist for the album, with the most widely distributed being a man lying in a bed on the beach with gym balls moving towards him. Later European editions, namely the UK special edition, use a similar, brighter shot taken at a different time of day with a slightly different number of gym balls. The American version of the album uses a shot of the clustered gym balls as the main cover art, with the man in bed on the reverse side of the image (the other side of the booklet). The Japanese edition also uses a shot of the gym balls, but bouncing on a grass field instead of the beach.

Designer Storm Thorgerson, who also designed the cover of their previous album, Bury the Hatchet, said: "The idea of red balls came from granules of coffee percolating the atmosphere, settling in your nose and waking you up. These became red (cranberries) and then enlarged to gym balls to satisfy our rampant egos. The location changed from an interior to an open space. Because this idea was preposterous, it needed testing before we did the proper thing on a beach in Somerset. The test... was done on a small grass aerodrome near London."

The version of the artwork featuring a man in bed on the beach is similar in concept to another Thorgerson creation, Pink Floyd's A Momentary Lapse of Reason. Thorgerson's anomalous  red balls recall another of his earlier album covers, Elegy by The Nice (1970).

Track listing

Non-album tracks

Personnel
The Cranberries
 Dolores O'Riordan – vocals, guitars, keyboards
 Noel Hogan – electric and acoustic guitars
 Mike Hogan – bass guitar
 Fergal Lawler – drums, percussion

Charts

Weekly charts

Year-end charts

Certifications and sales

References

External links
 

The Cranberries albums
2001 albums
Albums with cover art by Storm Thorgerson
Albums produced by Stephen Street
MCA Records albums